Allan Cyril Brooks (February 15, 1869 Etawah – January 3, 1946) was an ornithologist and bird artist who lived in Canada. His father William Edwin Brooks had been a keen ornithologist in India but growing up in a farming household in Canada made his entry into the career of bird art much more difficult than for his contemporary Louis Agassiz Fuertes in the United States of America. His painting style was more impressionist with a greater emphasis on the habitat than on fine details of plumage. After Fuertes' death in a road accident, he was commissioned to complete the plates for Birds of Massachusetts.

Life and career
Allan was born in Etawah in India, where his father, W. E. Brooks, worked in the railways while also studying the birds of India, particularly the leaf-warblers. His father named him after his close friend and ornithological associate in India, Allan Octavian Hume. Allan  went to school in England (1873–1881) and studied the bird life of the Northumberland moors. Thanks to his father's connections, he interacted with Henry Seebohm and learnt egg-collection and butterfly collection from the taxidermist John Hancock. He later studied the birds of Ontario where his father William Edwin Brooks had settled to a farming life.

In Canada, he met Thomas McIlwraith in 1885 and learnt specimen collecting and skinning techniques from him. In 1887, the family moved to Chilliwack, British Columbia. Robert Ridgway, the American ornithologist helped him identify birds early in Brooks' life and had shown appreciation for his art work. Brooks began his career as a specimen collector and game hunter, providing specimens to the Victoria Memorial Museum and a few private collectors. Towards the end of the 1890s Brooks contributed pictures for George Oliver Shields' Recreation magazine. Unlike wildlife artists in the United States of America during the same period, he did not find easy ways to support his interest in art. William Brewster wrote to him in 1895 that he could help him make the art work paying if Brooks could work harder. He then made some watercolours for Brewster, earning about three or four dollars for each illustration.

Brooks later began to contribute illustrations to periodicals such as Recreation and St. Nicholas Magazine. His first big commission was for a book by William Leon Dawson. Dawson had sought the work of Louis Agassiz Fuertes but found him too expensive. He subsequently found more work and became a distinguished bird artist, going on to illustrate Percy A. Taverner's Birds of Western Canada (1926) and Birds of Canada (1934). Brooks' style was more impressionistic, giving more emphasis to the background and artistry. Others artists like Fuertes tended to give more care to the detail in the foreground subject.

He was also recruited during World War I for his skills as a sharp-shooter and served with the 7th Canadian Infantry Battalion and later was a chief instructor training snipers. He was awarded with a Distinguished Service Order.

During the Second World War, he also contributed his paintings to the Red Cross.
While posted in Flanders, he reported on the birds of a war-zone. He noted that rats and pigs tended to become numerous. He also recorded the predation of bird's eggs by slugs, a phenomenon that was studied in greater detail only in 2017. In 1921, part of his home was burned down. In this fire, he lost many of his old notes and books including a series on Indian birds that he had since the age of 3. In 1926 he married Marjorie and in 1927 he moved to Brownsville, Texas from where he worked on illustrations for volume 3 of "Birds of Massachusetts", a work that had been interrupted by the death of Louis Fuertes.

References

External links
 Comox Archives and Museum
 Vernon Museum
 Major Allan Brooks of Okanagan Landing by Jean Webber, Royal British Columbia Museum Living Landscapes project
 Artwork by Allan Brooks
 Canadian artists

Canadian bird artists
Canadian illustrators
Canadian naturalists
Canadian ornithologists
People from Etawah
1869 births
1946 deaths
Persons of National Historic Significance (Canada)
Canadian people of Irish descent
19th-century Canadian painters
Canadian male painters
20th-century Canadian painters
People from Chilliwack
19th-century Canadian male artists
20th-century Canadian male artists